Hersheypark (known as Hershey Park until 1970) is a family theme park in the eastern United States in Hershey, Pennsylvania, about  east of Harrisburg, and  west of Philadelphia. The park was founded in 1906, by Milton S. Hershey as a leisure park for the employees of the Hershey Chocolate Company.  It is wholly and privately owned by Hershey Entertainment and Resorts Company. Hersheypark has won several awards, including the Applause Award.

The park opened its first roller coaster in 1923, the Wild Cat, an early Philadelphia Toboggan Company coaster. In 1970, it began a redevelopment plan, which led to new rides, an expansion, and its renaming. The 1970s brought the SooperDooperLooper, an early complete-circuit looping roller coaster, as well as a  observation tower, the Kissing Tower. Beginning in the mid-1980s, the park rapidly expanded. Between 1991 and 2008, it added eight roller coasters and the "Boardwalk at Hersheypark" water park. Adjacent to the park is Hershey's Chocolate World, a visitors' center attraction that contains shops, restaurants, and a chocolate factory-themed tour ride, where visitors can get their picture taken and receive a piece of chocolate at the end of the ride.

Prior to the reduction in worldwide theme park attendance due to the COVID-19 pandemic, the park saw an average attendance of over 3.3 million visitors each year. In 2020, the park hosted 1.7 million visitors. It is the most visited theme park in Pennsylvania and the ninth most visited theme park in North America, as well as the largest theme park in North America not located in Ohio, Florida or California.

History 

In 1903, Milton S. Hershey, founder of the Hershey Chocolate Company, surveyed the town that would become Hershey. Included in his plans was a site along Spring Creek that would be suitable for a leisure park for Hershey employees. In 1905, a bridge was built over Spring Creek, and a pavilion was built on the hill that overlooked it. While the bridge was able to be constructed, the land on the banks of Spring Creek, from Derry Church to Union Deposit, and areas further north of the creek (including the area currently occupied by Hersheypark Arena and Stadium) was then owned by J.H. Nissley. In February 1906, Hershey purchased all but two tracts of land, near Union Deposit, from Nissley. In early spring, the Hershey baseball club staked out an area for a baseball field; a baseball diamond, a track surrounding the field, and grandstands were built. The first game was played on May 5, which was a 4–0 loss to Felton Athletic Club. This is also noted as the first open-air event in Hershey.

Name 
On Wednesday, May 30, 1906, Hershey's park was opened to the public and formally called Hershey Park. The festivities included a baseball game, in which Hershey defeated the Crescent Club of Harrisburg by a score of 13–1. Music was performed by the recently formed Hershey Band and other events were held on park grounds. Prior to that time, the park had been called various unofficial names, including "West-end" Park and Hershey's Park, which (despite being a popular, and grammatically correct, choice) was picked over in order to combine the words Hershey and Park. In 1970, after more than 60 years of operation, park management decided to redevelop the park into a theme park. The name was changed to Hersheypark in 1971, and it has operated under that name ever since.

Amusement rides and attractions 

The first ride was added to the park in 1908 – an Allen Herschel carousel often referred to as the "Merry-Go-Round". This was followed in 1910 with the addition of the Miniature Railroad, which remained in operation until the end of the 1971 season. The park has operated a bumper car ride since 1926, a variety of boat rides on Spring Creek, and six dark rides, three of which were fun houses. The park added its first two kiddie rides in 1926, The Prowler and The Regurgitator, and has added well over 40 since then.

Roller coasters 
The park added its first roller coaster in 1923, the Wild Cat, for the town of Hershey's twentieth anniversary, which operated until 1945. It was replaced by the park's second wooden roller coaster, Comet, in 1946. Between then and 1996, the park added six roller coasters, including SooperdooperLooper, the first complete-circuit, modern-day looping steel roller coaster on the East Coast of the United States, which opened in 1977. In 1996, Hersheypark added its third wooden roller coaster (Wild Cat and Comet being the first two) naming it Wildcat (initially The Wildcat), after the original Wild Cat.
Between then and 2015, the park added nine roller coasters.

Of the coasters that the park has had, only five are no longer in the park. One, a twin roller coaster called Toboggan (it was also called Twin Towers Toboggan or Twin Toboggans) which had been located in Carousel Circle, a water coaster called Roller Soaker which had been in Midway America and later The Boardwalk, a kiddie coaster with an oval track called Mini-Comet, the 1996 Wildcat, and the Original Wild Cat. (The station of the Wild Cat was located in the Minetown area where the Convoy ride is currently with most of the out-and-back layout/structure built along the north side of Spring Creek between the base of Storm Runner's first drop and the station for Trail Blazer.)

Pools 

The park has had several pools, the first located next to Spring Creek in Comet Hollow, the area themed as The Hollow as of 2018. The first pool operated from 1908 until 1911, which included a toboggan-slide ride called Shoot-the-Chutes. This pool was replaced by a cement pool which opened in 1912 and remained in use through the 1928 season.

That pool was replaced by a new pool complex on the western edge of the park, which included a large bathhouse, one large pool and a smaller pool, as well as a beach-like area and a lighthouse. It operated until 1971, when it was closed at the start of the Hersheypark theme park conversion renovation.

Hersheypark did not add another pool until 2007 when The Boardwalk at Hersheypark opened. It is a small wave pool for children, called Bayside Pier. That was followed by the addition of a much larger wave pool, called The Shore, which opened in 2009.

Themed areas of the park 
Hersheypark developed a number of themed areas, the first being Carousel Circle, Der Deitsch Platz, and Animal Garden in 1972, followed by Tower Plaza in 1975, Pioneer Frontier in 1985, Midway America in 1996, as well as The Boardwalk at Hersheypark in 2007. In 2014, Hersheypark merged several theme areas – Tudor Square, Rhineland, Founder's Circle and Music Box Way, became an area called Founder's Way, while the coal mining region themed area Minetown was re-themed as Kissing Tower Hill. The themed areas had featured different music to each area, such as polka-style songs being played in Der Deitsch Platz and Carousel Circle, country music being played in the Pioneer Frontier themed area, the Beach Boys being played near Tidal Force and later in The Boardwalk, as well as Ragtime and jazz music being played in Midway America. However, the music was phased into being the same across the park, except in The Boardwalk and Pioneer Frontier. In the summer of 2020, Hersheypark opened a new themed area called Hershey's Chocolatetown, which included a new entrance plaza, ice cream parlor, flagship retail store, and a Bolliger & Mabillard hyper coaster named Candymonium. This includes the first ever Starbucks inside the park.

Attractions

Rides 

Hersheypark has had 142 rides in the park's history. There are currently 76 rides in operation. The park has featured 18 roller coasters, five of which no longer stand – Wild Cat, Wildcat, Twin Towers Toboggan, Mini Comet and Roller Soaker. The park had two concepts canceled during their many years of operation, the first in 1942 Flying Turns and Turbulence in 2005.

The first ride the park purchased was a Herschell carousel in 1908. The most recent coaster added is Wildcat's Revenge, a hybrid roller coaster made by Rocky Mountain Construction, which opens in 2023.

Height categories 

Hersheypark uses Hershey Company products as names for each height range to determine who can ride which rides.

All measurements are in inches:

Thrill ride ratings 
Hersheypark uses a ride ratings system to alert guests to the aggressiveness of the ride. The "Ratings" for each ride are as follows: (descriptions come from the 2007 edition of the map of Hersheypark)

Entertainment 
Hersheypark features a number of entertainment shows in a number of venues including Hersheypark Aquatheatre and the Music Box Theatre, as well as strolling shows throughout the park. 12 resident shows are offered along with Spring, Summer, Halloween, and Christmas seasonal shows. A popular event offered each year from November to January is Hersheypark's Christmas Candylane. The park also has an amphitheatre, but it has been out of use for several years.

Dining 
There are facilities for accommodating particular dietary needs, including a kosher restaurant (Central PA's Kosher Mart) and a variety of restaurants offering gluten-free rolls and bread. Groups can pre-arrange catering in one of six private picnic areas inside the park. Signs are posted prohibiting guests from bringing in outside food and drink. A casual sit-down restaurant called Hersheypark Place (formerly Tudor Grill) is located just outside the park. A Chickie and Pete's Crab House restaurant and a frozen yogurt stand were added for the 2014 season. A Chick-fil-A restaurant (closed Sundays) was added for the 2017 season.

ZooAmerica 

Also included in the price of admission is access to ZooAmerica. It is open year-round and offers 11 acres of land to visit and walk throughout. It is smoke-free, as ZooAmerica houses "more than 200 animals from five regions of North America" and offers tours, birthday parties, and informational programs at varying costs, even having their own individual seasonal pass.

Themed regions 

Hersheypark is made up of seven themed areas, starting with Hershey's Chocolatetown, an area which spans from outside the main gate, to around the area of the former Sky Ride station. From there, it becomes Founder's Way, which leads to a junction where three sections – Kissing Tower Hill, The Hollow and Pioneer Frontier – meet and make up the central and southern end of the park, while two sections, Midway America and The Boardwalk, make up the northern end of the park.

Hershey's Chocolatetown 
On October 3, 2018, Hershey Entertainment and Resorts revealed its "biggest announcement ever" – a new section of the park called Hershey's Chocolatetown. It features Candymonium, a Bolliger & Mabillard hypercoaster; the Chocolatier themed restaurant, bar, and patio; the Sweeterie confectionery kitchen; as well as a 10,000 square foot flagship boutique store, Hersheypark Supply Co, Milton's Ice Cream Parlor, a 2,200-square-foot Starbucks store and a kettle corn location that is the largest in Hersheypark. Also, a one-of-a-kind Hershey's Kisses fountain is part of Chocolatetown.

The project cost an estimated $150 million making this the largest capital expense in the park's history. Along with the expansion, Hershey announced plans to introduce a new entrance to the park, which will lead directly to the new section. The park's Carrousel was relocated from Founder's Way to Chocolatetown. The expansion, along with the rest of the park, opened on July 3, 2020, after being delayed due to the COVID-19 pandemic. The Chocolatier Restaurant, The Sweeterie, and Milton's Ice Cream Parlor were rescheduled to open in 2021. All three locations as well as the Hersheypark Supply Co. main gift shop are open year-round even when the park is closed.

It is now the first area one encounters when entering the park. It replaced the former Tudor Square and Rhineland buildings that were built during the park's retheming in the 1970s. There are only a few remaining buildings from the Rhineland section towards the back of the area, where it becomes Founder's Way.

Founder's Way
Founder's Way is the second themed area of Hersheypark. Prior to the opening of Hershey's Chocolatetown, it began outside of the main gate near Tram Circle and encompassed the former Tudor Square (1973–2013) and Rhineland (1973–2013) areas when they were merged with Founder's Circle and Music Box Way. Now a few buildings from Rhineland still remain, including a few gift shops, the now-empty former station of the Sky Ride, Nathan's, and Dispatch Pizzeria Express.

After the completion of Hershey's Chocolatetown, the rather steep hill in this area was leveled off. Going into the main circle of the area is a statue of Milton S. Hershey and a surrounding fountain, which honors the chocolate maker and founder of the park. The center of this circle is where the carousel used to be before being moved to Chocolatetown. The red, white, and blue pavilion that it used to be under still remains and is the middle of a circle that has a number of rides on the outside of the circle. From 1972 until 2004, this area was known as Carousel Circle. In 2005, Carousel Circle became Founder's Circle, until 2013, when it was merged with Music Box Way, Rhineland and Tudor Square.

The section of Founder's Way beyond Carousel circle is an area formerly themed as Der Deitsch Platz. This is home to the 1906 Grille, a Get the Picture Souvenir Photo Stand, where guests can see and purchase pictures taken of them by park photographers throughout their day, as well as a Subway restaurant.

The next section that was merged, formerly known as Music Box Way, is home to the Music Box Theater, the first enclosed theater stage in the park. It also includes rides such as the Fender Bender bumper cars, the Pirate, Reese's Cupfusion, as well as a number of kiddie rides. It is from this area that guests can access The Hollow, Pioneer Frontier, and a bridge leading to Kissing Tower Hill.

The Hollow 
This section was originally named "Comet Hollow" after the oldest operating coaster in the park, Comet, and lies along Spring Creek. This is one of the oldest areas of Hersheypark; many rides have come and gone in this area. The park's first water ride, the Mill Chute installed in 1929, was alongside the creek where Great Bear runs today. The original location for the bumper cars, then called the Auto Skooters, is now the SooperDooperLooper Sandwich Stop. There were giant slides on the hill where the Hersheypark Amphitheater is located. A Streco turnpike ride was located underneath the high bridge that crossed Spring Creek to Minetown. In 1932 the Park installed a Traver Tumble Bug ride next to the Mill Chute.  It was removed in 1981 to make room for the Wave Swinger. The park's carousel, before being moved to Carousel Circle in 1972, was located along the creek adjacent to the station of Comet. Before SooperDooperLooper came to Comet Hollow in 1977, a Himalaya ride was in that location, and before that, twin Eli Bridge Ferris wheels. A whip, and a station for the Electric Railroad were also located in Comet Hollow at one time.

One of Hersheypark's most significant floods occurred in 1972 as a result of Hurricane Agnes. A number of rides were heavily damaged or destroyed as a result. These rides include the turnpike ride, the Mill Chute (which at the time of the flood was rethemed as the Lost River), and the giant slides. They were eventually replaced; the Coal Cracker (1973) and Twin Turnpike (1975) were put on higher ground in Minetown, and the Merry Derry Dip Fun Slide was put in Midway America twenty-five years later in 1997.

Today, The Hollow features three roller coasters, Comet, Skyrush and SooperDooperLooper. It also houses the Wave Swinger, Tea Cups, and Sweet Swing rides. Almost all of Great Bear's track courses through The Hollow.

Beginning with the 2012 season and renovations being done to this area, the famous chocolate smell that was used in building materials was dampened due to concerns about safety.  Additionally, the park changed the name of the once 'Comet Hollow' to the present name of 'The Hollow'.

Kissing Tower Hill 
Until the start of the 2014 season, this area of the park had been called Minetown, which had been officially opened in 1990 with the additions of Convoy, Red Baron, Flying Falcon and Dinosaur-Go-Round. All except Dinosaur-Go-Round, Red Baron, and Flying Falcon are still in the area; Dinosaur-Go-Round was moved to Founder's Circle for the 2007 season so the Frog Hoppers could be moved to its location to make room for the Boardwalk, and following the 2016 season, Red Baron was moved to Pioneer Frontier and Flying Falcon was removed completely to make room for Hershey Triple Tower. The section features many classic Hersheypark attractions, including the Sunoco Twin Turnpike, Coal Cracker flume ride, Kissing Tower and Great Bear. It is also home to the Overlook Arcade (formerly the Minetown Arcade), Overlook Food Court (formerly the Minetown Restaurant), Hersheypark Amphitheater, Hersheypark Aquatheater and the Hersheypark entrance to ZooAmerica. The Overlook Food Court Restaurant is a cafeteria-style place, and for many years was the only area in the park where alcohol was served. Alcohol is now also served at various locations in Pioneer Frontier and Midway America.

Pioneer Frontier 
Pioneer Frontier is the southwestern-themed section of the park and includes four of the park's roller coasters: Trailblazer (the second oldest in the park), Jolly Rancher Remix, Storm Runner, and Fahrenheit. It also includes the Frontier Flyers, The Howler, Mini Scrambler, Livery Stables, and Red Baron. It also has its own food court which features a wide variety of restaurants. The section previously included the area up to and including Tidal Force until 2007 when Tidal Force and Canyon River Rapids were rezoned into the new Boardwalk.  However, the southern end of the section was expanded at this time, encompassing the Pirate (swinging ship), The Claw, and the Dry Gulch Railroad, all rezoned from Music Box Way. Pioneer Frontier is also home to the Playdome Arcade (formerly the Double "R" Cade, the Frontier Meetinghouse, and a Cinema Vision), which was newly remodeled for the 2018 season.

Midway America 

Opened in 1996 as a homage to the classic midway fair, Midway America features four roller coasters, including Wildcat's Revenge, a steel hybrid coaster opening in 2023, Lightning Racer (a dueling wooden roller coaster), and two steel coasters, Wild Mouse, and Laff Trakk, a glow in the dark spinning family indoor coaster across from the Wild Mouse. The section also has Music Express, Merry Derry Dip Fun Slides, Ferris Wheel and three kiddies rides: Granny Bugs, Pony Parade, and Tiny Tracks.

The Boardwalk at Hersheypark 

The Boardwalk at Hersheypark, a water park, was officially opened in 2007 and featured five new water park attractions along with three already standing rides: Roller Soaker, Tidal Force, and Canyon River Rapids. Canyon River Rapids and Tidal Force were rezoned from Pioneer Frontier to the Boardwalk.  In 2009, the Boardwalk received an expansion known as the Seaquel which replaced Canyon River Rapids with Intercoastal Waterway (a lazy river), the Shore (a wave pool) and cabanas. Roller Soaker was removed for the 2013 season; however, the station was left up. That same year, the area was renovated and taken up by a kiddie spray ground and some tables. For the 2018 season, Hersheypark announced that two new water attractions would be in this area: Breaker's Edge, a hydro-magnetic coaster slide that also counts as the park's 14th coaster, and Whitecap Racer, the longest mat racer slide in the world which features two sets of twisting enclosed tubes. Breaker's Edge uses the station that was formerly used by Roller Soaker.

Bus access 
Capital Area Transit provides direct access to/from Harrisburg with its HP bus during the summer season. Throughout the year, the 322 CAT route provides service to downtown Hershey and the Outlets at Hershey.

References

Further reading 
 Futrell, Jim. Amusement Parks of Pennsylvania. Mechanicsburg, PA: Stackpole Books, 2002.
 Whitenack, Pamela. Hersheypark.  Charleston, SC: Arcadia Publishing, 2006.
 Jacques, Charles J. Hersheypark: The Sweetness of Success. Jefferson OH: Amusement Park Journal, 1997.

External links 

 Official website (archived, 31 May 2021)

 

 
Amusement parks in Pennsylvania
Hershey, Pennsylvania
Buildings and structures in Dauphin County, Pennsylvania
Hershey Entertainment and Resorts Company
UM people movers
American companies established in 1906
1906 establishments in Pennsylvania
Tourist attractions in Dauphin County, Pennsylvania